The India–Myanmar border is the international border between India and Myanmar (formerly Burma).

Background

Description

The precise location of the tripoint with China is unclear owing to the Sino-Indian border dispute - at present, the de facto tripoint is located just north of the Diphu Pass. From here the border proceeds to the south-west through the Mishmi Hills, except for an Indian protrusion at the Chaukan Pass, then continuing through the Patkai and Kassom Ranges. At the south-east corner of Manipur it turns sharply westwards along various rivers for a period over to the Tiau River. It then follows this river southwards for a long stretch down to the Chin Hills, before turning west and proceeding to the Bangladeshi tripoint via a series of irregular lines.

History

Historically the border region has been a contested area located at the edge of the various Indian and Burmese empires. Britain had begun conquering India in the 17th century, and gradually took control of most of the country, forming British India. From the 1820s-80s Britain also gradually conquered Burma; by the Treaty of Yandabo in 1826 which ended the First Anglo-Burmese War Burma recognised British control over Assam, Manipur, Rakhine (Arakan), and the Taninthayi coast, thereby delimiting much of the modern boundary in general terms. In 1834 the Kabaw Valley areas was returned to Burma and a modified boundary delimited in this region, dubbed the 'Pemberton line' after a British commissioner, which was later refined in 1881. In 1837 the Patkai Hills were unilaterally designated as the northern boundary. Large swathes of Burma were annexed following the Second Anglo-Burmese War of 1852–53. The remainder of Burma was conquered in 1885 and incorporated into British India. In 1894 a boundary between Manipur and the Chin Hills was delimited, and the existing 'Pemberton line' boundary modified again in 1896. Further boundary modifications were made in 1901, 1921 and 1922.

In 1937 Burma was split off from India and became a separate colony. In 1947 India gained independence, however the country was split into two states (India and Pakistan), with the southernmost section of the Burma-India border becoming that between Burma and East Pakistan (modern Bangladesh). Burma gained independence in 1948. On 10 March 1967 Burma and India signed a boundary treaty which delimited their common frontier in detail. Security along the border has often been poor, owing to ongoing conflicts in north-east India and western Myanmar.

Barrier

The India–Myanmar barrier is a border barrier that India is constructing to seal its -long border with Myanmar. India hopes to curtail cross-border crime, including goods, arms and counterfeit currency smuggling, drug trafficking, and insurgency. The United Nations Drug Control Programme (UNDCP) and International Narcotics Control Board (INCB) also warned that the region could become a significant transit point for illicit drugs . Indian security forces blamed the porous border for the deaths of 200 security personnel and civilians in militancy-related violence in the region in 2001–2003. Four Northeast Indian states share the border with Myanmar: Arunachal Pradesh, Nagaland, Mizoram, and Manipur. Both national governments agreed to conduct a joint survey before erecting the fence. The Indian Home Ministry and its Myanmar counterpart completed the study within six months and, in March 2003 began erecting a fence along the border.

In 2004, fencing work in the state of Manipur along the border was stalled due to protests raised by the local Kuki and Naga communities. According to them, a huge stretch of land would become Myanmar's territory and foster unrest among people living on both sides of the border. The protests from people living in the Moreh, Chorokhunou, and Molchan areas forced the Home Ministry to refer the matter to the Manipur government. This fence will divide many ethnic communities, including the Mizo, Nagas, Chins, and Kukis whose lands straddle the regions between the two states- it is thus a highly sensitive issue. In 2007 it was reported that in the state of Manipur, a boundary dispute arose with ownership of nine border pillars being disputed.

IMBF will remain under ITBP and will patrol the border to the zero line (as of January 2018).

Border bazaars 

See Haats on India-Myanmar border.

Border crossings

Designated immigration and customs crossings

 Moreh, India to Tamu, Myanmar in Manipur.
 Zorinpui International border crossing in Mizoram.

Other local border crossings

There are over 250 villages with over 300,000 people living within  of the border who frequently cross the border through 150 small and large formal and informal border crossings.

Arunachal Pradesh State  
 Diphu Pass to Myanmar in Arunachal Pradesh.
 Nampong to Pangsau Pass near Lake of No Return on Myanmar side, via National Highway 153 (India) (Ledo Road which is part of Stilwell Road)

Manipur State  
 Behiang to Khenman via Tedim Road.
 Moreh to Tamu has an integrated immigration check post with customs.

Mizoram State  
NH-54  is part of the larger East-West Corridor connecting North East India with the rest of India. It is a designated customs and immigration post, open to all categories of international travellers with valid travel document and visa. 
 Zokhawthar to Khawmawi and Rikhawdar via the bridge over the Harhva river.

Maritime boundaries 

India and Myanmar have maritime exclusive economic zones in each other's vicinity.

See also
 India–Myanmar relations

References

 
border
Borders of India
Borders of Myanmar
International borders